The 2014 Asia Women's Four Nations Championship was hosted in Hong Kong from 18–24 May, matches were played as a round robin format. Kazakhstan were undefeated and successfully defended their Asian Four Nations title.

Table

Results

References 

2014 in Asian rugby union
2014 in women's rugby union
Asia Women's Four Nations
Asia Rugby Women's Championship